Puckpool Battery (map reference ) is a battery located at Puckpool Point, close to the town of Ryde on the Isle of Wight. It is one of the many Palmerston Forts built on the island to protect it in response to a perceived French invasion. Construction of the battery began in 1863 and was completed by March 1865. 

During construction of the battery it was decided that it would be armed entirely with 50 of the heaviest mortars - at that time the 13-inch smooth bore mortar. This would enable the battery to provide large amounts of high angle plunging fire into the Solent, targeted at the vulnerable unarmoured decks of warships.

In 1873 four gun positions were constructed at the sea face of the battery for four 11-inch Rifled Muzzle Loading (RML) guns. My 1886 these four guns and 30 mortars provided the entire armament of the battery. The following year all of the mortars were removed as they were obsolete by that time.

In 1888 a proposal for two 10.4-inch 28-ton RML guns on an Armstrong protected barbette was put forward, and these had been fitted by 1892. They were the only guns of this type to be fitted in Great Britain. In 1901 the armament of the battery was modernised with positions for two 9.2-inch Breech Loading (BL) guns and two 6-inch Breech Loading (BL) guns.

The battery was disarmed in 1927 and sold to the local district council the following year. It was brought back into use during the Second World War as HMS Medina to train men of the Fleet Air Arm. 

It has been used as a public recreational space since that time and has since been designated a Scheduled Ancient Monument. The gun positions are openly accessible and a number of original buildings survive. These include the guard room, barrack block and magazines.

References

Publications

 Moore, David, 2010. The East Wight Defences, Solent Papers Number 10, David Moore, Gosport.

External links
 Victorian Forts data sheet

Forts on the Isle of Wight
Palmerston Forts
Infrastructure completed in 1865
Artillery batteries